Phineas Stearns (February 5, 1736 - March 27, 1798) was a farmer and blacksmith from Watertown, Massachusetts. In 1773 he participated in the Boston Tea Party. He was also a soldier in the American Revolutionary Army at Lake George (1756) and the leader of a company of militiamen at Dorchester Heights during the Siege of Boston. His efforts in the Battles of Lexington and Concord earned him the rank of captain.

Stearns declined a colonel's commission due to the poor health of his wife, Hannah Bemis, who left five children in his care when she passed. He later married Bemis' cousin, Esther Sanderson. His career in public service ended in 1776. He died on March 27, 1798. In 1884 historian Francis Samuel Drake wrote, "[Stearns] was distinguished for his benevolent and cheerful disposition, and for strong common sense and strict integrity."

References

Bibliography

Boston Tea Party Museum.com

1736 births
1798 deaths
Continental Army soldiers
People from Watertown, Massachusetts
People of colonial Massachusetts